General elections were held in Zambia on 12 August 2021 to elect the President, National Assembly, mayors, council chairs and councillors. Hakainde Hichilema of the United Party for National Development was elected president, defeating incumbent Edgar Lungu of the Patriotic Front.

On 16 August, Lungu conceded in a televised statement, sending a letter and congratulating Hichilema.

Electoral system
The President is elected via the two-round system. Of the 167 members of the National Assembly, 156 are elected by the first-past-the-post system in single-member constituencies, with a further eight appointed by the President and three others being ex-officio members: the Vice President, the Speaker and a deputy speaker elected from outside the National Assembly (a second deputy speaker is chosen from among the elected members). The minimum voting age is 18, whilst National Assembly candidates must be at least 21.

Candidates
A total of sixteen candidates registered to run for the presidency. The race was expected to be a close race between Edgar Lungu of the Patriotic Front and Hakainde Hichilema of the United Party for National Development. Both competed in the 2016 presidential elections, which Lungu won by a margin of 50.35% to 47.63%.

Campaign
On 15 May 2021, Electoral Commission of Zambia chair Esau Chulu launched the start of the election campaign. However politicians were advised to minimise large crowd gatherings during campaign meetings due to the COVID-19 pandemic. The National Assembly was dissolved on 12 May by President Edgar Lungu to provide a level playing field in the campaign. However, Lungu remains in office as per constitutional requirements.

Violence and virus cases rise
On 26 May Lungu launched his own campaign. He also directed the police service and Ministry of Health to ensure enforcement of the COVID-19 pandemic health regulations and guidelines without fear or favour. On 3 June, due to the rise in COVID-19 cases, the Electoral Commission suspended campaign rallies again to avoid large crowds. On 15 June, the Electoral Commission banned the Patriotic Front and United Party for National Development from campaigning in Lusaka, Mpulungu, Namwala and Nakonde due to political violence. The Commission also banned all roadshows across the country to curb the transmission of COVID-19. On 1 August Lungu ordered the deployment of the military to help the police fight escalating political violence during the campaign.

On 28 July UPND Secretary General Batuke Imenda released a statement that the party was disappointed with government institutions being used by President Lungu to block UPND presidential candidate Hakainde Hichilema from campaigning. On 30 July, Hichilema and his campaign team were prevented from entering Chipata and detained on the runway of Chipata Airport. Before Hichilema's arrival in Chipata, police had teargassed his supporters. On 3 August, police in Mbala blocked Hichilema and his campaign team from entering the town, with police claiming that he needed a permit to enter.

Campaign tactics
Hichilema heavily criticised Lungu, claiming he had used state power to interfere with the elections. In a campaign video, Hichilema portrayed Lungu as a morally corrupt individual with a history of monetary mismanagement, while portraying himself as fiscally responsible.

Conduct
On 12 August, during election day, several Twitter users went to the platform to report that social media and messaging apps, including Facebook, Instagram, and WhatsApp appeared to be shut down in the country. Internet users employed VPN services to bypass the restrictions on WhatsApp and social media platforms. Information and Broadcasting Services Permanent Secretary, Amos Malupenga, denied the reports, calling them "malicious." He further went on "that the government would not tolerate abuse of the internet and if any mischief occurred, therefore the government, expects citizens to use the internet responsibly. But if some people choose to abuse the internet to mislead and misinform, the government will not hesitate to invoke relevant legal provisions to forestall any breakdown of law and order as the country passes through the election period," Malupenga said.

Amidst his comments, social media sites continued to be restricted in the country.

Results
On 16 August Hakainde Hichilema was declared president-elect of Zambia. At the time of the announcement, 155 out of Zambia's 156 constituencies had been counted, with only Mandevu constituency still to declare. As the votes in that constituency were insufficient to affect the outcome, the electoral commission announced Hichilema's victory. Edgar Lungu conceded defeat shortly after the announcement.

President

National Assembly

The election in Kaumbwe constituency did not take place on 12 August due to the death of the UPND candidate and was postponed until 21 October 2021.

Reactions

Domestic
 On 14 August Edgar Lungu, the incumbent president, declared the elections "not free and fair" and stated they should therefore be nullified. He was pointing to the violence that happened in three provinces during election day when two members were murdered and PF supporters went into hiding. He also added that the governing party polling agents were brutalized and chased from polling stations, a situation that left the ruling party votes unprotected. On 16 August Edgar Lungu and the Patriotic Front conceded and accepted defeat, sending a letter and congratulating president-elect Hichilema. Lungu also conceded in a televised statement, "I would like to congratulate my brother Hakainde Hichilema for being elected as the 7th president of mother Zambia".

International 

 : On 14 August the EU Chief observer published a Press Release only commenting on observation undertaken up until the 14th of August. Maria Arena, the Chief Observer, said the election was largely calm and well-administered despite long queues, which shows the devotion of Zambians to exercise their right to vote; however, concerning the campaign, the Chief Observer noted that the campaigns took place in a highly competitive environment, adding that selective application of laws and regulations, misuse of state resources and one-sided media reporting meant that a level playing field was not achieved. The EU EOM is yet to publish its final report, with recommendations for improving the electoral framework for future elections.
: On 14 August the head of the African Union's observer mission, Ernest Bai Koroma said that voting "operations were conducted in a peaceful, transparent and professional manner".
 : Nigerian President Muhammadu Buhari congratulated President-elect Hakainde Hichilema on his victory. He also commended incumbent president Edgar Lungu for accepting the outcome of the election and a peaceful transfer of power, "noting that this patriotic disposition deserves the praise of all lovers of democracy."
 : Zimbabwe's main opposition leader Nelson Chamisa congratulated Hichilema's victory, "I’m so humbled and excited to have received a call and personally congratulated my brother and President-elect Hichilema".
 : Forum for Democratic Change Deputy secretary general Harold Kaija congratulated Hichilema's upon his victory over the incumbent president Edgar Lungu.
 : Both president Cyril Ramaphosa and main opposition leader John Steenhuisen congratulated Hichilema's victory.

References

Zambia
General election
Zambia
Presidential elections in Zambia
Elections in Zambia